Triglochin calcitrapa  is a species of flowering plant in the family Juncaginaceae, first described by William Jackson Hooker in 1848, and native to south-west Western Australia.

Description
(From Hooker

References

External links
Triglochin calcitrapa images from iNaturalist

Juncaginaceae
Flora of Western Australia

Plants described in 1848